"A Face in the Crowd" is a song written by Karen Staley and Gary Harrison, and recorded by American country music artists Michael Martin Murphey and Holly Dunn.  It was released in January 1987 as the first single from Murphey's album Americana.  The song reached number 4 on the Billboard Hot Country Singles & Tracks chart and number 7 on the Canadian RPM Country Tracks chart.

Chart performance

References

1987 singles
1987 songs
Michael Martin Murphey songs
Holly Dunn songs
Warner Records singles
Songs written by Gary Harrison
Songs written by Karen Staley